The Iron Clad Building is a landmarked building in Cooperstown, New York. It was built in 1862 by James Bogardus, the pioneer of cast iron architecture. It is a contributing building to the Cooperstown Historic District.

References

Buildings and structures completed in 1862
Buildings and structures in Otsego County, New York
James Bogardus buildings
1862 establishments in New York (state)
Cast-iron architecture in New York (state)
Historic district contributing properties in New York (state)